Jandia Eka Putra (born 14 July 1987), is an Indonesian professional footballer who plays as a goalkeeper.

Club career

PSIS Semarang
He was signed for PSIS Semarang to play in Liga 1 in the 2018 season. Jandia made his league debut on 25 March 2018 in a match against PSM Makassar at the Andi Mattalatta Stadium, Makassar.

PSS Sleman
He was signed for PSS Sleman to play in Liga 1 in the 2022–23 season. Jandia made his league debut on 13 August 2022 in a match against Barito Putera at the Maguwoharjo Stadium, Sleman.

International career
Jandia Eka was called up to the Indonesia national football team, and made his debut on 17 May 2012 in a friendly match against Mauritania at the Nablus Football Stadium, Nablus.

Honours

Club

Semen Padang
Indonesia Premier League: 2011–12
Indonesian Community Shield: 2013

References

External links
 Jandia Eka Putra at Soccerway
 Jandia Eka Putra at Liga Indonesia

1987 births
Living people
Indonesian footballers
Minangkabau people
PSP Padang players
Semen Padang F.C. players
PSIS Semarang players
PSS Sleman players
Indonesian Premier Division players 
Indonesian Premier League players 
Liga 1 (Indonesia) players
Indonesia international footballers
People from Padang
Association football goalkeepers
Sportspeople from West Sumatra